Alfilorios Reservoir is a reservoir in Asturias, Spain across the Barrea River. The dam is located in Ribera de Arriba, but the reservoir is between this municipality and Morcín. It has the aim of supply water to the central zone of Asturias, essentially Oviedo and also an area for fishing and canoeing.

Construction
The construction of the dam started in 1968, but one year later the works were disrupted until 1974. After this year, the construction continued until 1983. The dam was finally opened in 1990.

References

External links
Profile at CHC
Profile at Embalses.net

Reservoirs in Asturias
Dams completed in 1983